SS Marquette was a British troopship of 7,057 tons which was torpedoed and sunk in the Aegean Sea  south of Salonica, Greece  on 23 October 1915 by , with the loss of 167 lives.

The ship was originally planned as SS Boadicea, for the Wilson and Furness-Leyland Line, but was acquired by the Atlantic Transport Line shortly after completion to replace ships requisitioned during the Spanish–American War. She made a single voyage under the name Boadicea, and was renamed Marquette on 15 September 1898.

The sinking of Marquette 
On 19 October 1915 the ship departed from Alexandria, Egypt, destined for Salonika (now Thessalonika) in Greece. The total ship's complement was 741: 95 crew, 6 Egyptians, the No 1 Stationary Hospital (36 nurses, 12 officers and 143 other ranks), and the Ammunition Column of the British 29th Division (10 officers and 439 other ranks). There were also 491 mules and 50 horses on board. Captain John Bell Findlay (born 1853 in Montrose, Scotland; died Essex 1938) was Master.

On leaving Alexandria, the ship was accompanied by a French destroyer escort, however the escort left Marquette on the night of 22 October. At 9.15 a.m. on 23 October, the ship was hit by a torpedo on the starboard side and immediately listed to port. Some on board were killed by the explosion, while others were killed by lifeboats which were inexpertly launched - one, for example, fell onto another which was already in the water. The ship sank within ten minutes, with nurses, soldiers and crew still on board. Many survivors died in the water while waiting to be rescued.

The Stationary Hospital had been allocated to a troop ship by the British authorities, despite the empty British hospital ship Grantully Castle having sailed on the same route on the same day from Egypt to the northern Greek port of Thessaloniki. The loss of nurses and medical staff led to the New Zealand government asking the War Office (via the Governor, Lord Liverpool) in November 1915 that transfers of medical staff be done by hospital ships where possible Subsequent voyages of the 1st New Zealand Stationary Hospital were made in hospital ships.

Survivors
The surviving members of the Stationary Hospital sailed from Salonika back to Alexandria on 29 October, on the hospital ship HMHS Grantully Castle, and continued to serve for the remainder of the war. Survivors included New Zealand surgeons Hugh Acland and Ebenezer Teichelmann and nurses Minnie Jeffery, Mary Looney and Jean Erwin.

Casualties  

29 crew, 10 nurses and 128 troops died in the sinking. 32 of the dead were New Zealand nationals: 19 from the Royal New Zealand Army Medical Corps, 3 privates (medical orderlies) attached to the Stationary Hospital and 10 nurses from the Royal New Zealand Army Nursing Service. Casualties included:

Aftermath 
A naval Court of Enquiry into the sinking was held on the protected cruiser  in Salonika Harbour on 26 October. The report, dated 3 November, found that no-one was at fault.

The sinking and the deaths of ten New Zealand nurses caused public outrage in New Zealand, particularly in the South Island where most of the nurses had come from. The deaths were used in propaganda to encourage men to recruit for the war. Medical staff had not needed to be on the troop transport ship, as a marked hospital ship had left the same port on the same day and would in theory have been safe from attack. In November 1915, New Zealand's governor Lord Liverpool requested future transfers of medical personnel be done by hospital ships if possible.

Discovery of the shipwreck 
In 2009, the wreck of Marquette was located and verified by divers. The British Embassy in Greece issued a protection order over the wreck.

Memorials 
The names of the dead are recorded in the Mikra British Cemetery in Greece.

The Nurses' Memorial Chapel at Christchurch Hospital in New Zealand commemorates the three Christchurch nurses who drowned.

In October 2015, on the centenary of the sinking, memorial events were held in New Zealand. In Christchurch a historical display, a memorial service and a lecture were held and St Margaret's College performed a stage play based on the Marquette story, "Roses of No Man's Land". In Waimate, a memorial service was held and a commemorative plaque was unveiled.

Notes

References

External links
 Newspaper report of Marquette Disaster
 Marquette Disaster in Nursing History
 Mikra Memorial in CWGC cemetery Thessaloniki, Greece commemorating the deaths

1897 ships
Ships built on the River Clyde
World War I passenger ships of the United Kingdom
Maritime incidents in 1915
World War I shipwrecks in the Aegean Sea
Troop ships of the United Kingdom
Ships sunk by German submarines in World War I
Sinking of the SS Marquette